Overwork is the expression used to define the cause of  working too hard, too much, or too long. It can be also related to the act of working beyond one's strength or capacity, causing physical and/or mental distress in the process.

Compulsory, mandatory, or forced overtime is usually defined as hours worked in excess of forty hours per week “that the employer makes compulsory with the threat of job loss or the threat of other reprisals such as demotion or assignment to unattractive tasks or work shifts." In 2016, 488 million people were exposed to long working hours (≥55 hours/week), and 745,194 deaths and 23.3 million DALYs were attributable to long working hours.

Voluntary overwork 
Voluntary overtime is work which the employer may ask the worker to do but which the worker is not required to work unless they agree at the time to do so.
A different kind of overwork occurs when a full-time employee of one company quietly accepts a full-time side job in another company. The phenomenon is also known as “overemployment” and is a challenge to employers whose staff usually works remotely. The issue affects employee efficiency and poses a potential threat to the company's image and operations.

Compulsory overwork 
Compulsory overwork is that where the individual has no choice but to work more than their capacity. In other words, compulsory overwork is the lack of control that workers exercise over the boundary between work time and private time.

Consequences 
Forced overtime, heavy workloads, and frenetic work paces give rise to debilitating repetitive stress injuries, on-the-job accidents, over-exposure to toxic substances, and other dangerous work conditions. Nevertheless, some studies are beginning to show the costs of compulsory overwork. Reg Williams and Patricia Strasser, professors of nursing at the University of Michigan, estimated in the journal of the American Association of Occupational Health Nurses that the total cost of depression at work was as high as $44 billion. They pointed out that healthcare workers have focused much attention on the workplace risk factors for heart disease, cancer, obesity, and other illnesses, but little emphasis on the risk factors for depression, stress, negative changes in personal life, and difficulties in interpersonal relationships.

Annual average work hours for Americans have risen from 1,679 in 1973 to 1,878 in 2000. This represents an increase of 199 hours—or approximately five additional weeks of work per year. This total work effort represents an average of nine weeks more than European workers. Therefore, it is within this logic of working more to gain more that workers are living a very hectic and tiring time to provide their families. The result in reality is an excess that does not often translate into high salaries. There are categories of workers where the work and the environments are unhealthy turning the most vulnerable workers and sentenced to fatigue and even living less.

Emotional effects 

The emotional impacts of overwork can vary, depending on the amount of work, levels of pressure and competition in the work space. Employees who worry about not getting work finished and keeping up a fast pace can feel like they are drowning in their workload, a feeling that manifests itself in chronic stress and anxiety, which can cause depression and create tension in personal and work relationships. The behavior continues even if the worker becomes aware that it is personally harmful — even harmful to the quality of the work. The stress that goes along with working too much has been shown to lead to substance abuse, sleep disorders, anxiety and ultimately to physical problems.

Physical effects 

One of the key indicators that an individual is being overworked, and not merely challenged, is if work-related stress begins to take a toll on their physical health and general lifestyle. It is easy to distinguish different types of physical symptoms, such as getting sick frequently due to a weakened immune system, depression and insomnia. All these symptoms can cause more fatigue-related errors at work and affect their personal lives.

According to the Mayo Clinic, other physical symptoms may include headache, neck pain, lower back pain, depression, changes to appetite and chronic fatigue.

A study published in 2021 by the World Health Organization (WHO) showed that working more than 55 hours per week increases the risk of stroke by 35% and the risk of dying from heart disease by 17%, compared to working 35-40 hours per week.
In addition, a study conducted by WHO in collaboration with the International Labour Organization (ILO) found that almost three-quarters of those who died from overwork were middle-aged or older men. In many cases, the deaths occurred much later in life, sometimes decades later, than the long hours were worked.

By country

United States 
Compulsory overtime and overwork present a growing "convergence" between workers regardless of their occupation, income, education, race, gender, or citizenship. For example, in the United States, immigrants and other low-wage workers toil excessive hours in traditional sweatshops, such as garment factories, restaurants and other industry sectors. At the same time, exposés of "white-collar" and "electronic" sweatshops debunk the glamour of high-tech employment revealing large numbers of higher-paid skilled workers who work upwards of seventy to ninety hours a week under increasingly autocratic conditions.

With the steep rise in annual work hours for individuals and families, more than half of American workers report feeling overworked, overwhelmed by the amount of work they have to do, and/or lacking in time to reflect upon the work they are doing. Overwork is attributable to several trends. First, the climb in annual family work hours since 1979 has coincided with an era of stagnant and falling wages. Annual family work hours have swelled primarily because unprecedented numbers of women have entered the full-time workforce, and those who were already in the workforce have taken on increased hours of work to boost family incomes. Without the increased work hours of women, lower-and middle-income families would have seen their incomes fall or at best remain stagnant. African American and Latino families, whose average hours of work grew faster than white families throughout the 1980s and 1990s, would have been especially hard hit.

Many immigrant workers are faced with the stark choice of complying with required overtime, increased workloads, and frenetic work paces, or being fired. Workers are pressured to compete with one another for longer hours to keep their jobs and avoid being replaced by workers who are more compliant with employer demands. Undocumented immigrant workers are particularly susceptible to demands for excessive hours. The threat of deportation, along with the criminalization of their work status, creates a climate of vulnerability that unscrupulous employers use to cheapen labor and extract more work.

Japan 
The Japanese term karōshi translates as "overwork death", it is described as occupational sudden mortality. The government estimates that 200 people die from karōshi every year because of heart attacks, strokes and cerebral hemorrhages due to a poor diet and long hours spent at the workplace.

Workers typically used less than half of their leave allowance in a year, according to a survey by the labour ministry which found that in 2013 employees took only nine of their 18.5 days average entitlement. A separate poll showed that one in every six workers took no paid holidays at all in 2013. In early discussions, employer groups proposed limiting the number of compulsory paid holidays to three days, while unions called for eight.

China 

Overwork is reported to be a major issue in China. The Chinese manufacturing industry is well known for forcing young children to work long hours in production sweatshops. It is reported that about 12.9% of employees work more than 10 hours of overtime a week in China, in fact, Chinese employees work nearly 50 hours in one work week. It is also reported that every year in China, more than half a million people die from overwork.

South Korea 
According to OECD data, Koreans work 2,024 hours a year, ranking third in the world among OECD countries.This is 280 hours longer than the OECD average of 1,744 hours.  Also, according to a survey conducted by Job Korea, South Korean office workers worked an average of 2.5 days a week, with an average night shift of 2 hours and 30 minutes per night. However, only 37.7 percent of the office workers said they would receive overtime pay. As a result of such overwork, 95 percent of Korean office workers suffer from "burnout syndrome" (a phenomenon in which people who were motivated to work suffer from extreme physical and mental fatigue and become lethargic). This working environment has also killed workers. About 300 workers died of cerebral cardiovascular disease, a typical type of overwork, in the 2017 industrial accident statistics. It accounts for 37.1 percent of 808 workers who died of work-related illnesses.

Problems caused by overwork are getting bigger and bigger in Korea. To counter this problem of overwork, the government is working on a policy of measures. As a precautionary measure, the medical institution implements 'long-term guidelines for health management of workers', 'evaluation of the risk of developing diseases for prevention of cerebrovascular diseases', and the operation of 'worker health centers'. And after overwork, the company operates the industrial insurance system and paid vacation system as safety nets. In addition, it has passed a revision to the Labor Standards Act of 52 hours per week, guaranteeing the lives of workers and enhancing labor productivity.

The "52 hours per week" is a law applied from July 1, 2018, which reduces the maximum weekly working hours from 68 hours to 52 hours. However, a year after the law went into effect, the policy effect of the labor system does not appear to be working well yet in 2019.  According to a survey of 1,170 workers who quit their jobs at Job Korea in 2019, 23.2 percent chose working overtime and life impossible to separate from work as reasons for leaving the company, which was the top reason for leaving the company. In the same survey conducted in 2018, 'My Future Vision Looks Low' was chosen as the top reason for leaving the company. Compared to 2018, frequent overtime topped the list of resignations in 2019, apparently due to the same or increased actual working hours, although the official working hours have decreased since the implementation of the 52-hour workweek. However, there are also positive changes due to shorter working hours. According to the tally by the Ministry of Culture, Sports and Tourism, the average leisure time for people in 2018 was 5.3 hours on weekends and 3.3 hours on weekdays, up 0.3 hours each from the latest tally of 2016. The average monthly leisure cost also rose 15,000 won to 151,000 won during the same period.[17] "Because the 52-hour work system was implemented in July 2018, and there is virtually no punishment, it is still difficult for the 52-hour work system to have a policy effect," said Kim Yoo-sun, president of the Korea Labor and Social Institute. As for cases where only working hours are reduced and the workload remains the same, he said, "At first, the goal was to create jobs by reducing working hours, but now the government seems to focus only on reducing working hours and not trying to nurture jobs. As it was a fully anticipated side effect, the government needs to actively manage the job issue as well."

Government and policy makers 
Fair Labor Standards Act (FLSA)
International Labour Organization (ILO)

See also

 All work and no play makes Jack a dull boy
Critique of work
Chronic fatigue syndrome
Effects of fatigue on safety
Labor rights
Occupational burnout
Occupational safety and health
Occupational stress
Overachievement
Right to rest and leisure
Sleep-deprived driving
Workaholic

References

Occupational safety and health
Working time
Labor relations